Jayendra is a given name of Indian origin. People with that name include:

 Jayendra Saraswathi (1935-2018), 69th Shankaracharya Guru and head or pontiff (Pïțhādhipati) of the Kanchi Kamakoti Peetham
 Jayendra Shekhadiwala (born 1952), Gujarati poet, critic and professor
 Jayendra Thakur (born 1953), gangster from Vasai-Virar, Mumbai

See also
 Sri Jayendra Saraswathy Matriculation Higher Secondary School, Ondipudur, Singanallur, Coimbatore
 Sri Jayendra Saraswathi Silver Jubilee School, Tirunelveli, Tamil Nadu
 

Indian given names